Cyril Charles Simpson (19 April 1874 – 5 June 1953) was an English cricketer. He played one first-class match for Northamptonshire against Essex in 1908. He later played three matches for the Straits Settlements against the Federated Malay States between 1919 and 1922.

References

1874 births
1953 deaths
English cricketers
Straits Settlements cricketers
Northamptonshire cricketers